Verreaux's monal-partridge (Tetraophasis obscurus) or the chestnut-throated partridge, is a bird species in the family Phasianidae. It is found only in central China. Its natural habitat is boreal forest.

The common name commemorate the French naturalist Jules Verreaux.

References

Verreaux's monal-partridge
Birds of Central China
Endemic birds of China
Verreaux's monal-partridge
Taxonomy articles created by Polbot